Dimepregnen (INN, BAN) (developmental code name ST-1411), or 6α,16α-dimethylpregn-4-en-3β-ol-20-one, is a pregnene steroid described as an antiestrogen that was synthesized in 1968 and was never marketed. It is similar in structure to the progestins and progesterone derivatives melengestrol and anagestone.

See also 
 Anagestone acetate
 Medroxyprogesterone acetate
 Megestrol acetate
 Melengestrol acetate

References 

Sterols
Antiestrogens
Antigonadotropins
Ketones
Pregnanes
Progestogens